Electronic metal may refer to:

Coldwave, a sub-genre of industrial metal that merges various musical styles and includes synthesizer accompaniment; not to be confused with French Cold wave
Digital hardcore, synth-punk mixed with hardcore punk with influences from heavy metal music and noise
Dungeon synth, synth-metal fused with black metal and dark ambient
Electronic rock
Electronicore, synth-metal mixed with metalcore
Electrogrind, synth-metal mixed with grindcore
Industrial metal
Metalstep, varying metal styles such as nu metal mixed with varying electronic genres such as dubstep and grime
Neue Deutsche Härte, an industrial metal sub-genre based out of Germany
Nintendocore, video game music/chiptune and post-hardcore mixed with heavy metal influences
Synth-metal